Tankōbon volume 1 to volume 20 encapsulates chapters 1 to 200. Shogakukan released all twenty volumes between June 18, 1994, and July 18, 1998. Viz Media licensed and released the first twenty volumes between September 7, 2004, and July 21, 2009.



Volume list

References

External links
Detective Conan story arc database 

Case Closed volumes (1-20)

zh:名侦探柯南漫画列表